Hysteroid dysphoria is a name given to repeated episodes of depressed mood in response to feeling rejected.

Hysteroid dysphoria has been described in outpatient populations and is thought to be a subtype of atypical depression involving rejection sensitivity and therapeutic response to monoamine oxidase inhibitors.

While some research shows that hysteroid dysphoria responds well to MAOIs, other research has suggested that the difference actually comes from the condition being less sensitive to tricyclic antidepressants.

Other studies have examined the symptoms associated with hysteroid dysphoria and found that while the symptoms are observable, they are not unique or distinct enough to be considered their own condition.

See also 

 Dysphoria
 Depression

References

Mood disorders